Lisbeth Constance Trickett, OAM (born 28 January 1985) is a retired Australian swimmer. She was a gold medallist at the 2004 Summer Olympics, the 2008 Summer Olympics, and the 2012 Summer Olympics. She was the world record holder in the short-course (25m) 100-metre freestyle.

Personal life
Trickett was educated at Somerville House. She married swimmer Luke Trickett among scenes of tight security at Taronga Zoo on Sydney Harbour on 7 April 2007. The couple entered via a "walking tent", due to the exclusive photo deal the couple had with women's magazine New Idea. The couple revealed later they split the photo profits between three charities. In March 2015, the couple announced that they were expecting their first child, due in September, after suffering a miscarriage in August 2014. She gave birth to a girl, Poppy Frances Trickett, on 31 August 2015. Their second daughter, Edwina Daisy "Eddie" Trickett, was born on 23 February 2018.

She changed to swimming under her married name at the Australian 2008 Olympic selection trials.

On 9 September 2009 she announced that she would take an extended break from swimming and consider retirement. On 14 December 2009 she retired from swimming at the age of 24. In September 2010, she announced that she would be returning to competition.

Career
Trickett emerged on the world scene in March 2003 at the Australian championships, by July she was a medal contender in multiple events at the 2003 World Championships in Barcelona.

At the 2003 World Championships, Trickett picked up her first individual medal on the international level in the 50-metre freestyle capturing the bronze medal, while placing 5th in the 100-metre freestyle, 14th in the 50-metre and 19th over the 100-metre butterfly, her individual inconsistency came to an end when she won another bronze in the 4×100-metre freestyle relay. Her fastest 100-metre freestyle sprint in which she set in the lead off leg in the relay would have captured herself another bronze in the individual 100-metre freestyle.

Trickett is currently employed by Megaport – an Australian dark fiber carrier – as a National Channel and Partner Manager.

2004 Athens Olympics
Trickett was also a bronze medalist in the 50-metre freestyle. She had previously been the holder of the 100-metre freestyle world record (53.66) set at the Olympic swimming trials held in Sydney, Australia on 31 March 2004, but lost this to teammate Jodie Henry (53.52) during the semi finals of the event at the 2004 Athens Olympics.

2005 World Aquatics Championships

In July 2005, at the 2005 World Aquatics Championships in Montreal, Canada, Trickett was one of the form swimmers of the meet. She won the 50-metre freestyle in a time of 24.59 to record her maiden championship at international level. She also achieved a silver medal in the 100-metre butterfly (57.37). She was a member of three relay teams, the 4×100-metre freestyle relay, 4×100-metre medley relay, and the 4×200-metre freestyle relay teams, winning gold (3:37.22), gold (3:57.47) and silver (7:54.00) in the respective events. Fairly new to the 200-metre freestyle event, Trickett got recorded the then fourth fastest time in history clocking 1:57.06 as lead-off swimmer in the final of the 4×200-metre freestyle relay. The time being more than 1.5 seconds faster than the individual gold medallist Solenne Figuès of France (1.58.60). Trickett did not compete in the individual 100-metre freestyle because she placed third in the event at the Australian championship, but her 100-metre freestyle split times were faster than the individual 100-metre freestyle gold medalist and world record holder Jodie Henry, which earned her the honor of swimming in the final of the medley relay. Despite not competing in the individual 100- and 200-metre freestyle, she did finish 2005 ranked number one in the world in both events.

On returning to Australia, Trickett continued her rich vein of form, lowering the 100-metre short course freestyle world record on consecutive nights at the Australian Short Course Championships to 51.70 seconds.

2005 brought a further world record in the short-course 200-metre freestyle at the Sydney, Australia stop of the 2005 FINA World Cup series on 19 November with Trickett recording a time of 1:53.29 to beat the previous record by 0.75 seconds.

However, Trickett regained her 100-metre freestyle world record on 31 January 2006 at the Australian Championships in Melbourne. Her time of 53.42 was 0.1 of a second faster than the previous record held by Henry. On 2 August 2006, German swimmer Britta Steffen broke Trickett's 100-metre freestyle world record at the 2006 European Championships in Budapest, Hungary, with a time of 53.30. Trickett again regained the world record with a time of 52.88 on 27 March 2008 at the 100-metre finals of the Australian Olympic Trials.

2006 Commonwealth Games

At the 2006 Commonwealth Games she won silver medals in the women's 100-metre butterfly and 200-metre freestyle events. She defeated Henry to claim the 50-metre and 100-metre freestyle, and was a part of the winning 4×200-metre and 4×100-metre freestyle relay teams, as well as breaking the world record in the 4×100-metre medley relay, where her split of 52.87 seconds eclipsed the previous best by Henry. She took 5 of Australia's 12 gold medals in the 2006 Short Course World Championships in Shanghai, being named the leading female swimmer of the meet.

In the latter part of 2006, Trickett won four titles at the Australian Short Course Nationals – both the 50-metre and 100-metre freestyle and butterfly events. More commonly known for her freestyle expertise, she set a new Australian and Commonwealth record in the 50-metre butterfly and a new world record for the 100-metre butterfly.

2007 World Aquatics Championships

On 26 March at the 2007 World Aquatics Championships in Melbourne, Trickett added another gold by winning the 100-metre butterfly in a championship record time – 57.15 seconds – touching the wall just 0.09 seconds ahead of her second-placed teammate Jessicah Schipper and American Natalie Coughlin. Then, on 1 April, she won another gold by nine one-hundredths of a second.

Shortly following the 2007 World Championships, on 3 April, at the biannual Duel in the Pool meet between Australia and the US swimming teams (in Sydney, Australia in 2007), she swam a 100-metre freestyle in 52.99, well under the existing world record of 53.30 by Germany's Britta Steffen, and making her the first woman under 53 seconds in a long-course (50 m) pool. The time was not accepted by FINA as the world record, because the race the time was swum in is not, itself, a recognized FINA event according to the ruling.

Trickett went on to officially break the record in a time of 52.88 seconds on 27 March 2008 in the 100-metre finals of the Australian Olympic Trials. Two days later on 29 March 2008 she broke the world record for the 50-metre freestyle finals in the Australian Olympic Trials with a time of 23.97, taking 0.12 of a second off the previous record and being the first women to be under the 24-second barrier.

2008 Beijing Olympics

At the Beijing Olympics, Trickett's first final was the 4×100-metre freestyle capturing a bronze medal, despite setting a new Australian record. Her next final was the 100-metre butterfly in which she captured Gold setting a new Australian record, making her the second fastest in that event in history. Trickett's next event was the 100-metre freestyle, where she was the world record holder. Trickett was ahead of world record pace in the first 50-metre but was overtaken in the last few meters by rival Britta Steffen who captured the gold. Trickett later contested the 50-metre freestyle (another event she was the world record holder) but did not get on the podium finishing just outside the medals in fourth. In what seemed to be a terrible Olympics for Trickett, things finally turned when her last event was the 4×100-metre medley relay. In what was a competitive race at early on, turned in the Aussies favor down the stretch as they captured gold and a new world record.

After the Olympics Trickett split with Widmar, who had coached her from before she made her debut for Australia. Trickett said that she needed a change to rejuvenate her. She joined the Sopac Swim Club under Grant Stoelwinder in Sydney. Stoelwinder is a sprint coach and currently mentors Eamon Sullivan.

Trickett had a great start to the 2009 World Championships, capturing bronze in the 4×100-metre freestyle relay, setting an Australian record in the lead off. Her next individual performances were somewhat anticlimactic, in the 100-metre freestyle she finished with another bronze and finished 5th in the 50-metre freestyle. and the final night she anchored the medley relay to a silver.

Retirement and comeback
After retiring in December 2009, she announced her return to swimming in September 2010. At the 2012 Olympic Trials she narrowly missed a berth in the 100-metre butterfly finishing 3rd. Later on in the meet she finished 5th in the 100-metre freestyle, booking a spot on the 4×100-metre freestyle relay.

2012 London Olympics
Trickett raced in the heats of the 4×100-metre freestyle relay team. Because Australia went on to win gold in the final, setting a new Olympic record, she won the 4th Olympic gold medal of her career.

Second retirement
In 2013 Trickett retired again due to a wrist injury.

Career-best times

Recognition
2016 – Sport Australia Hall of Fame inductee

See also
 List of Australian records in swimming
 List of Commonwealth Games records in swimming
 List of Olympic medalists in swimming (women)
 List of World Aquatics Championships medalists in swimming (women)
 List of Commonwealth Games medallists in swimming (women)
 World record progression 50 metres freestyle
 World record progression 100 metres butterfly
 World record progression 100 metres freestyle
 World record progression 200 metres freestyle
 World record progression 4 × 100 metres freestyle relay
 World record progression 4 × 100 metres medley relay

References

External links

 
 

1985 births
Living people
Australian female butterfly swimmers
Australian female freestyle swimmers
World record holders in swimming
Olympic swimmers of Australia
Swimmers at the 2004 Summer Olympics
Swimmers at the 2008 Summer Olympics
Swimmers at the 2006 Commonwealth Games
Olympic gold medalists for Australia
Olympic silver medalists for Australia
Olympic bronze medalists for Australia
Commonwealth Games gold medallists for Australia
Commonwealth Games silver medallists for Australia
Recipients of the Medal of the Order of Australia
Sportspeople from Townsville
Commercial Swimming Club swimmers
Australian Swimmers of the Year
World record setters in swimming
Olympic bronze medalists in swimming
World Aquatics Championships medalists in swimming
Griffith University alumni
Sportswomen from Queensland
Swimmers at the 2012 Summer Olympics
Medalists at the FINA World Swimming Championships (25 m)
Medalists at the 2012 Summer Olympics
Medalists at the 2008 Summer Olympics
Medalists at the 2004 Summer Olympics
Olympic gold medalists in swimming
Olympic silver medalists in swimming
Commonwealth Games medallists in swimming
Sport Australia Hall of Fame inductees
21st-century Australian women
Medallists at the 2006 Commonwealth Games